Beate Ellingsen (born 28 October 1950 in Oslo) is a Norwegian interior designer and furniture designer.

References

1950 births
Norwegian designers
Living people
People from Oslo
Furniture designers
20th-century Norwegian people